New South Wales is one of Australia's states, and has established several state symbols and emblems.

Official symbols

See also
 List of symbols of states and territories of Australia
 Australian state colours

References

Citations

Sources 

 NSW State Flag
 NSW State Emblems

+
Society in New South Wales